Pacific Destiny is a 1956 British drama film directed by Wolf Rilla and starring Denholm Elliott, Susan Stephen and Michael Hordern. The screenplay concerns a young British couple who win the respect of the inhabitants of a South Pacific island during the colonial era.

It was based on A Pattern of Islands, a memoir by Sir Arthur Grimble recounting his time in the Gilbert and Ellice Islands as a cadet officer and Resident Commissioner in the 1920s.

Film credits show Samoa as the filming location.

Plot
The true story of inexperienced District Officer Cadet Arthur Grimble (Denholm Elliott) who arrives with his bride Olivia (Susan Stephen) on a remote Pacific island to work in the Colonial Service. He finds it hard to meet the approval of his superior, the Resident Commissioner (Michael Hordern), who had been expecting a more experienced man. The harder Grimble tries to please him, the more things seem to go awry, and he soon finds himself banished to a smaller neighbouring island. Olivia though is not as easily discouraged as her husband by the situation, and lends her support in a way that eventually meets with the approval of the island people.

Cast
 Denholm Elliott ...  Arthur Grimble
 Susan Stephen ...  Olivia Grimble
 Michael Hordern ...  Resident Commissioner
 Felix Felton ...  Uncle
 Peter Bathurst ...  Uncle
 Clifford Buckton ...  Uncle
 Gordon Jackson ...  District Officer
 Inia Te Wiata ...  Tauvela
 Henrietta Godinet ...  Lama
 Su'a Ezra Tavete Williams ... Tiki-Tiku
 Hans Kruse ...  Kitiona
 Ollie Crichton ... Taloa
 Rosie Leavasa ... Sea Wind
 Moira Walker ...  Voice-of-the-Tide
 Sani ... King's-Bundle-Of-Mats
 Fiti ... Grandmother
 John Bryce ... Tulo
 Tuiletufuga Taualai ... Matangi
 Afamasaga Kalapu ... Teraloa
 Ovalau Bureta ... Fa'afetai
 Cecilia Fabricious ... Movement-Of-Clouds
 Polo ... Fa'alavelave
 Tusa ... Prisoner
 Noa ... Warder

Dances arranged by The Hon. Peseta Sio and Mailo

Critical reception
Leonard Maltin called it a "Boring (but true) story"; TV Guide again, though praising the performances of Elliott and Hordern, called it "a routine and boring story with a pretty picture backdrop": and British Pictures noted  "A pleasant bit of colonial travelogue, most notable for being Britain's first fiction film in Cinemascope."

References

External links

1956 films
1950s adventure drama films
English-language Samoan films
Films directed by Wolf Rilla
British drama films
British Lion Films films
Films scored by James Bernard
Films shot in Samoa
Films set in Kiribati
1956 drama films
1950s English-language films
1950s British films